Hessian State Museum may refer to:

 Hessian State Museum, Darmstadt
 Hessian State Museum, Kassel
 Museum Wiesbaden